Harrison Ridley Jr. (October 22, 1938 – February 19, 2009) was a radio broadcaster.
He was the host of The Historical Approach to the Positive Music radio show on WRTI (90.1 FM). The "historical approach" Ridley took was to focus on one musician per show, sometimes on a specific period in the musician's career. The show ran for more than thirty years and was popular in Philadelphia. Ridley would often say that his phone lines in the studio were full of calls. Local jazz musicians had been known to call in during a show as well.

Ridley was a record collector and archivist. In fifty years of collecting, he owned more than 8,500 LPs, 3,000 78s, 200 45s, 300 CDs, and 6,000 books on African American history and music. He specialized in Duke Ellington albums (he had more than 600) and Benny Carter (he had 200 Benny Carter albums).

Ridley was a custodian for the Philadelphia School District for 39 years. He visited schools to teach students, parents, and staff about jazz. He did not use the term "jazz," opting instead for "this music referred to as jazz" or simply, "the positive music."

He taught music history at Temple University and Villanova University.

Ridley received more than 80 awards, including recognition from the Philadelphia City Hall and the Pennsylvania House of Representatives, and an honorary doctorate in Music from Villanova University (given in May 2008). He also worked as a consultant for the Library of Congress. Dubbed a "walking encyclopedia of jazz" Ridley was in demand on radio and television. He was an archivist for the Philadelphia Clef Club of Jazz and Performing Arts.

Ridley was known to often say the phrase, “Yes, indeedy!” during his broadcasts.

Ridley died on February 19, 2009 weeks after a stroke.

References 

2009 deaths
American music critics
Jazz writers
1938 births